Émilie Menuet (born 27 September 1991) is a female racewalker from France. She competed in the Women's 20 kilometres walk event at the 2015 World Championships in Athletics in Beijing, China.

Biography 

On 1 July 2015, at Blois, she established a new  record of France for the 5000m walk  (21:41.72). She has held equally since 2010 the junior record of France at the 10 km walk  (47:26).

In May 2015, when at the European Walking Cup at Murcie, elle bettered her personal record at the 20 km walk (1:32.20) and gained the minimum qualifier for the 2015 World Championships.  She placed 31st at these World Championships

Champion of France at the 20 km walk in 2014, she won the title at the 10000m walk at the 2015 French Athletic Championships.

Prize list 
French Athletic Championships :
winner of 10 000 m walk in 2015
winner of 20 km walk in 2014
French Indoor Athletic Championships :
winner of 3,000 m walk in 2015

Records

See also
 France at the 2015 World Championships in Athletics

References

External links 
 
 
 

French female racewalkers
Living people
1991 births
World Athletics Championships athletes for France
Athletes (track and field) at the 2016 Summer Olympics
Olympic athletes of France
Sportspeople from Blois